Saraveca is an extinct Arawakan language once spoken in Bolivia by the Sarave. It is said to be the only language with a numeral system based exclusively on five, although quinary systems exist. To some extent this is also an areal feature of other South American languages; many form their numbers 6–9 as "five + one", "five + two" and so on.

References

Languages of Bolivia
Languages of Argentina
Extinct languages of South America
Arawakan languages
Mamoré–Guaporé linguistic area